Robbinsville, New Jersey or Robinsville, New Jersey may refer to:

Robbinsville Township, New Jersey, a township in Mercer County
Robbinsville (CDP), New Jersey, a census-designated place within Robbinsville Township
Robinsville, New Jersey, an unincorporated community in Monmouth County